The nomination period for the third annual Shorty Awards opened in January, 2011, and ran through February 11, 2011, except for new categories that had extended nomination deadlines. There were 30 official categories, and five special categories. In addition to Real-Time Photo of the Year, for the first time the awards accepted nominations for Foursquare Mayor of the Year, Foursquare Location of the Year, Microblog of the Year on Tumblr, and a Connecting People award. The awards also introduced new Shorty Industry Awards to recognize the best uses of social media by brands and agencies. A Marketing Jury within the Real-Time Academy of Short Form Arts & Sciences judges the Shorty Industry Awards and determines the winners from among the paid entries. Winners were announced at a ceremony on March 28, 2011, hosted by Aasif Mandvi in the Times Center. Other Shorty Awards presenters were scheduled to include Kiefer Sutherland, Jerry Stiller, Anne Meara, Stephen Wallem, Miss USA Rima Fakih, and Miss Teen USA Kamie Crawford.

Winners 
The third annual winners by category:

Special Awards

References 

Shorty Awards
2011 in Internet culture